Convención de Juegos de Mesa y Comics is a multi-genre convention held bi-annually in Monterrey, Mexico by Entretenimiento Creativo SA de CV. It is dedicated to anime, comic books, science fiction, fantasy, video games, trading card games and board games.

The Convención de Juegos de Mesa y Comics features panels, conferences, gaming, video games area, karaoke, Japanese culture area, adult gaming, anime video room, music programming, celebrities, artists, voice actors, contests, tournaments and exhibitors.

Previous Guests of Honor
 Iyari Limon from Buffy the Vampire Slayer
 Virginia Hey from FarscapeFarscape
 Sean Astin from The Lord of the Rings
 Ron Perlman from Hellboy
 Marina Sirtis from Star Trek: the Next Generation
 Michael Rosenbaum from SmallvilleSmallville (Canceled a week before show due to production of Season 7)
 Tahmoh Penikett from Battlestar Galactica
 Doug Jones from Hellboy
 Striken (band) from Monterrey
 Cesar "Sangre Otaku" Franco (Digimon) from Mexico

Previous musical guests
 Swinging Popsicle
 Bespa Kumamero

CJMC 2010
 November 20–22, 2010
Musical Guests: Aural Vampire, Anghelo, Iruma Rioka
Spanish Voice Actors: Caco Aliaga, Jose Manuel Vieiria, Hugo Nuñez
Comic Book Artists: Edgar Delgado
Special Guest: David Rojas Paranormal Expert
Special Events: Qualifier for the Yamato Cosplay Cup
Contests: Cosplay, Drawing, Karaoke, Lady Gothic, Graffiti, Modelism

External links
 Convención de Juegos de Mesa y Comics official website

Multigenre conventions
1992 establishments in Mexico